The Henry F. Beinke House (also known as the Wm. Wollbrink House) is a historic house located at 610 Jefferson Street in Washington, Franklin County, Missouri. It is locally significant as an example go the Missouri-German style of architecture.

Description and history 
It was built about 1878, and is a -story, side entry brick dwelling resting on a stone foundation. The facade is three bays wide and it has a side-facing gable roof and segmental arched door and window openings. It has a small rear addition added about 1900.

It was listed on the National Register of Historic Places on September 14, 2000.

References

Houses on the National Register of Historic Places in Missouri
Houses completed in 1878
Buildings and structures in Franklin County, Missouri
National Register of Historic Places in Franklin County, Missouri